A Strange Passion is a 1984 French drama film directed by Jean-Pierre Dougnac, starring Brigitte Fossey, Fernando Rey and Saverio Marconi. The story is set in Italy in the late 18th century. It is based on the short story "The Foundling" by Heinrich von Kleist.

Emmanuelle Béart was nominated for Most Promising Actress at the 10th César Awards.

Cast
 Brigitte Fossey as Elvire
 Fernando Rey as Piacchi
 Saverio Marconi as Nicolo and Colino
 Agostina Belli as Zaveria
 Emmanuelle Béart as Constanza
 Roger Planchon as the bishop
 Remo Remotti as Peppo
 Miranda Martino as Elvire's mother
 Margherita Sala as Antonia
 Salvatore Napolitano as Nicolo as a child
 Alexis Cabot as Paolo
 Michaela Sciurpa as Clara
 Guido Alberti as Valerio, Piacchi's friend
 Daniele Dublino as the father superior
 Pietro Rosella as the coachman

References

1984 drama films
1984 films
Films based on short fiction
Films based on works by Heinrich von Kleist
Films set in Italy
Films set in the 1790s
French drama films
Films scored by Luis Bacalov
1980s French films